Notohermetia is a genus of flies in the family Stratiomyidae.

Species
Notohermetia pilifrons James, 1950

Distribution
Vanuatu.

References

Stratiomyidae
Brachycera genera
Diptera of Australasia
Endemic fauna of Vanuatu